Bockenheim may refer to:

 Bockenheim (Frankfurt am Main), a city district of Frankfurt am Main, Germany
 Bockenheim an der Weinstraße, a municipality in Rhineland-Palatinate (Bad Dürkheim), Germany
 Stein-Bockenheim, a municipality in Rhineland-Palatinate (Alzey-Worms), Germany
 Bockenheim, a former town merged in 1794 into Sarre-Union, Alsace, France